Joseph H. Goldenhersh (November 2, 1914 – March 11, 1992) was an American jurist.

Born in East St. Louis, Illinois, Goldenhersh received his law degree from Washington University Law School and was admitted to the Illinois bar in 1936. He practiced law in East St. Louis, Illinois. From 1964 until 1970, Goldenhersh served on the Illinois Appellate Court and was involved with the Democratic Party. Goldenhersh served on the Illinois Supreme Court from 1970 until his retirement in 1987. He served as chief justice of the court from 1979 to 1982. Goldenhersh lived in Belleville, Illinois. He died in a hospital in St. Louis, Missouri from a stroke after undergoing open heart surgery.

Notes

1914 births
1992 deaths
People from East St. Louis, Illinois
Washington University School of Law alumni
Illinois Democrats
Judges of the Illinois Appellate Court
Chief Justices of the Illinois Supreme Court
20th-century American judges
Justices of the Illinois Supreme Court